Paul Graener (11 January 1872 – 13 November 1944) was a German composer and conductor. He composed numerous operas and orchestral works in the Romanticism style.

Biography
Graener was born in Berlin and orphaned as a young child.  A boy soprano, he taught himself composition and in 1896 moved to London, where he gave private lessons and served briefly as conductor at the Haymarket Theatre. Before the move, he had married Maria Elisabeth Hauschild, who bore him three children in London. Graener is recorded in the United Kingdom Census of 1901 as a "musical director (theatre)" living at 3 Poplar Grove in Hammersmith together with Maria (born in Kiel), their first two children (Heinz and Paul, aged 4 and 2) and Graener's author cousin, George.

In around 1910, Graener moved to Vienna, where he took up a teaching post at the Neues Wiener Konservatorium. He moved several times in the 1910s, living in Salzburg, Dresden and Munich, eventually accepting the position of professor of composition at the Leipzig University of Music and Theatre which had previously been held by Max Reger. In 1925, he left in order to focus on composition.

Returning to Berlin in 1930, he directed the Stern'sches Konservatorium and, from 1935 to 1941, served as vice-president of the Reichsmusikkammer. This position, previously held by Wilhelm Furtwängler, was a major governmental post within an arm of the Nazi Propaganda Ministry, although the extent to which Graener sympathized with Nazi ideals is a subject of debate - however, Erik Levi states in Graener's entry in the New Grove Dictionary of Music and Musicians (ç. 1988) that he continued to support the regime until he died. In the late 1920s, Graener had joined the Militant League for German Culture, and on 1 April 1933 he became a member of the Nazi Party. During World War II, his Berlin apartment was bombed and he moved with his family to, successively, Wiesbaden, Munich, Vienna and Salzburg, where he died aged 72 in 1944.

Stylistically, Graener was heavily indebted to the late Romanticism of Richard Strauss and Max Reger.

Works

Operas
The Faithful Sentry, Op. 1 (premiered 1899)
Das Narrengericht, Op. 38 (1913)
Don Juans letztes Abenteuer, Op. 42 (1914)
Theophano, Op. 48 (premiered 1918, Munich)
Schirin und Gertraude, Op. 51 (1920)
Hanneles Himmelfahrt, W/o Op. (1927) (after Gerhart Hauptmann's play)
Friedemann Bach, Op. 90 (1931) (after Albert Emil Brachvogel's novel)
Der Prinz von Homburg, Op. 100 (1935)
Schwanhild (1941, premiered January 4, 1942, Cologne)

Orchestral
2 Stücke, Op. 9
3 Stücke, Op. 26
Sinfonietta for Strings and Harp, Op. 27 (1910)
Symphony in D Minor Schmied Schmerz (1912, Op. 39)
Aus dem Reiche des Pan, Op. 22 (1920)
Romantische Phantasie, Op. 41
Musik am Abend, Op. 44
Variationen über ein russisches Volkslied', Op. 55 (from 1926)Waldmusik, Op. 60
Divertimento in D major,  Op. 67
Piano Concerto, Op. 72Juventus academica (overture), Op. 73Gotische Suite, Op. 74Concerto for Cello and Chamber Orchestra, Op. 78 (published in 1927)Die Flöte von Sanssouci, Op. 88 (1930)Comedietta, Op. 82Variationen über Prinz Eugen, Op. 108 (1939)Sinfonia breve, Op. 963 schwedische Tänze, Op. 98
Violin Concerto, Op. 104Feierliche Stunde, Op. 106Turmwächterlied, Op. 107 (1938)Wiener Sinfonie, Op. 110 (1941, First Performance: Hans Knappertsbusch, Berlin Philharmonic)
Flute Concerto, Op. 116

Chamber music
4 String Quartets (incl. Opp. 54, 65 and 80 published 1920-8 )
Suite, Op. 63 for flute and piano (published in 1924 )

Other
ca. 130 songs

References

Don Randel, The Harvard Biographical Dictionary of Music''. Harvard, 1996, p. 327.
Knut Andreas, Zwischen Musik und Politik: Der Komponist Paul Graener (1872–1944), Frank&Timme Berlin, 2008.

External links
 Site dedicated to Graener
 
 

1872 births
1944 deaths
Musicians from Berlin
20th-century classical composers
German classical composers
Nazi Party politicians
Militant League for German Culture members
Academic staff of the University of Music and Theatre Leipzig
German male classical composers
20th-century German composers
20th-century German male musicians